David Kerr Archibald (20 September 1902 – ?) was a Scottish professional footballer who played as a full back in Scottish football for Parkhead, Morton and Clyde, in the Football League for York City, in American football for the New York Nationals and in Irish football for Shelbourne.

Footnotes

References

1902 births
Footballers from Glasgow
Year of death missing
Scottish footballers
Scottish expatriate footballers
Association football fullbacks
Parkhead F.C. players
Greenock Morton F.C. players
New York Nationals (ASL) players
Clyde F.C. players
York City F.C. players
Shelbourne F.C. players
Scottish Football League players
American Soccer League (1921–1933) players
English Football League players
Expatriate association footballers in the Republic of Ireland
Expatriate soccer players in the United States
Scottish expatriate sportspeople in Ireland
Scottish expatriate sportspeople in the United States